Babbs is an English surname and may refer to:

Ken Babbs (born 1939), American novelist, psychedelic leader and Merry Prankster of the 1960s
Tank (American singer) (born 1976), real name Durrell Babbs, American singer

See also
Babb

English-language surnames